Cao Ju ( 220s – early 260s) was an imperial prince of the state of Cao Wei in the Three Kingdoms period of China.

Life
Cao Ju was a son of Cao Cao, a warlord who rose to prominence towards the end of the Han dynasty and laid the foundation for the Cao Wei state. His mother was Lady Huan (環氏), a concubine of Cao Cao. He had two full brothers: Cao Chong (elder) and Cao Yu (younger).

In 211, Cao Ju was enfeoffed as the "Marquis of Fanyang" (范陽侯) by Emperor Xian, the figurehead emperor of the Han dynasty under Cao Cao's control. In 217, his title was changed to "Marquis of Wan" (宛侯).

In 220, following Cao Cao's death, Cao Ju's half-brother Cao Pi usurped the throne from Emperor Xian, ended the Han dynasty, and established the Cao Wei state with himself as the new emperor. Cao Pi first enfeoffed Cao Ju as a duke in 221, but promoted him to a prince under the title "Prince of Zhangling" (章陵王) in 222. Later in 222, he changed Cao Ju's title to "Prince of Yiyang" (義陽王). Sometime between 222 and 224, he changed Cao Ju's title to "Prince of Pengcheng" (彭城王) and relocated him to Pengcheng (彭城; around present-day Xuzhou, Jiangsu), where Cao Ju's mother Lady Huan was living. Later, he changed Cao Ju's title to "Prince of Jiyin" (濟陰王). In 224, Cao Pi issued an edict to reform the nobility system by reducing the sizes of princedoms from commanderies to counties. Cao Ju's title was thus changed to "Prince of Dingtao (County)" (定陶王).

In 232, after Cao Rui (Cao Pi's successor) restored the nobility system to the previous one, Cao Ju became the "Prince of Pengcheng (Commandery/State)" (彭城王) again. In 237, Cao Ju had 2,000 taxable households removed from his princedom as punishment after he was found guilty of ordering the manufacture of restricted items. Cao Rui also issued an imperial edict to reprimand Cao Ju for his conduct. The 2,000 taxable households were returned to him in 239.

Throughout the reigns of the subsequent Wei emperors (Cao Fang and Cao Huan), the number of taxable households in Cao Ju's princedom increased until it reached 4,600.

Family
Cao Ju had at least three sons. One of them, Cao Cong (曹琮), was designated as the heir of Cao Ju's elder brother Cao Chong, because Cao Chong died early and had no son to succeed him. The other two, Cao Fan (曹範) and Cao Chan (曹闡), were consecutively designated as the heirs of Cao Zizheng, a half-brother of Cao Ju, because Cao Zizheng too died early and had no son to succeed him.

See also
 Cao Wei family trees#Lady Huan
 Lists of people of the Three Kingdoms

Notes

References

 Chen, Shou (3rd century). Records of the Three Kingdoms (Sanguozhi).
 Pei, Songzhi (5th century). Annotations to Records of the Three Kingdoms (Sanguozhi zhu).

Year of birth unknown
Year of death unknown
Family of Cao Cao
Cao Wei imperial princes